Sand Island is a dune-covered island in the Columbia River, and part of Rooster Rock State Park.

References

Columbia River Gorge
Islands of the Columbia River in Oregon
Landforms of Multnomah County, Oregon
Uninhabited islands of Oregon